Shanti Bon is park located in Hojai, Assam in Northeast India. Shanti Bon is situated near Deshabandhu Bidyapith HS High School, Hojai in Hojai.

Garden
There are different kinds of flowers. The place has a small and clean pond with thousands of fishes, A temple of Maa Kali, Shiv & Radhe Krishna. It has a children's park also.

Originally, this place was a Hindu cremation ground until 2019.

References

Nagaon